Sandra Borgsmiller Kerns (born July 20, 1949) is a retired American movie and television actress who worked on television in the 1970s and 1980s before retiring to care for her family with husband Hubie Kerns Jr., a stuntman.

Early years
Sandra Borgsmiller is one of five children born to Dr. William J. Borgsmiller (died August 4, 1999) and June K. Borgsmiller (died June 11, 2008).

Career
In 1979, Kerns starred in Hawaii Five-O as Maren in the episode "Stringer". However, Kerns is probably best known to viewers for her role as Ellen Powell on Charles in Charge. She was a regular cast member when the show initially went into first-run syndication in January 1987. However, in the final two seasons, she abruptly left the show and only made three more appearances (once in season four and twice in season five). She last acted in 1993, but appeared as herself in an episode of E! True Hollywood Story in 2006.

Family
Kerns and her husband were married on a Malibu mountain top in 1975, and currently live in Pacific Palisades, California. They have two children, including son Zack and daughter Kallie who also was an actress and stunt performer.

Filmography

Film

Television

References

External links 

 

1949 births
Living people
American film actresses
American television actresses
People from Greater Los Angeles
21st-century American women